Hamza Qasim  (born 1933) is a retired Iraqi football goalkeeper, who played with the Iraq national team in the 1957 Pan Arab Games. He also played for Al-Minaa.

Coaching career
Qasim served as coach for Al-Minaa from 1971 to 1974.

Multi-talent and activities
Qasim was born in Basra, and was a multi-sport athlete. In addition to being an international footballer, he was a basketball player for the Iraq national basketball team. He was also a competitor in athletics (high jump and 110 metres hurdles).

Qasim founded the first Iraqi Badminton Federation, and founded the first team for badminton in Iraq, establishing men's and women's teams in 1970s.

Personal life
Qasim is married to Iraqi actress Salima Khudhair and lives with her in Baghdad. and they have one son, the actor Wissam Hamza, who died in an accident in Syria in 2011.

References

External links
Al-Minaa club honors Hamza Qasim
Al-Minaa Club: Sailors of south

Living people
1933 births
Sportspeople from Basra
People from Basra
Association football goalkeepers
Iraqi footballers
Iraq international footballers
Iraqi men's basketball players
Hurdlers
Iraqi male hurdlers
Al-Mina'a SC players
Iraqi football managers
Al-Mina'a SC managers